Bear Valley is a census-designated place in Alpine County, California, best known as the location of the Bear Valley ski area. The population was 121 at the 2010 census, down from 133 at the 2000 census.

Geography
Bear Valley is within the Stanislaus National Forest and is reached by State Route 4. Although inside Alpine County, Bear Valley Fire Department has contracted with California Department of Forestry, San Andreas, for dispatching.

History
Bear Valley post office opened in 1967.

Demographics

2010
The 2010 United States Census reported that Bear Valley had a population of 121. The population density was 23.4 people per square mile (9.0/km2). The racial makeup of Bear Valley was 119 (98.3%) White, 0 (0.0%) African American, 0 (0.0%) Native American, 1 (0.8%) Asian, 0 (0.0%) Pacific Islander, 0 (0.0%) from other races, and 1 (0.8%) from two or more races.  Hispanic or Latino of any race were 1 persons (0.8%).

The Census reported that 121 people (100% of the population) lived in households, 0 (0%) lived in non-institutionalized group quarters, and 0 (0%) were institutionalized.

There were 67 households, out of which 11 (16.4%) had children under the age of 18 living in them, 27 (40.3%) were opposite-sex married couples living together, 0 (0%) had a female householder with no husband present, 0 (0%) had a male householder with no wife present.  There were 4 (6.0%) unmarried opposite-sex partnerships, and 0 (0%) same-sex married couples or partnerships. 33 households (49.3%) were made up of individuals, and 4 (6.0%) had someone living alone who was 65 years of age or older. The average household size was 1.81.  There were 27 families (40.3% of all households); the average family size was 2.67.

The population was spread out, with 18 people (14.9%) under the age of 18, 7 people (5.8%) aged 18 to 24, 28 people (23.1%) aged 25 to 44, 51 people (42.1%) aged 45 to 64, and 17 people (14.0%) who were 65 years of age or older.  The median age was 48.8 years. For every 100 females, there were 124.1 males.  For every 100 females age 18 and over, there were 139.5 males.

The homeowner vacancy rate was 29.9%; the rental vacancy rate was 75.3%.  94 people (77.7% of the population) lived in owner-occupied housing units and 27 people (22.3%) lived in rental housing units.

2000
As of the census of 2000, there were 133 people, 67 households, and 32 families residing in the CDP. The racial makeup of the CDP was 90.23% White, 2.26% Native American, 0.75% from other races, and 6.77% from two or more races. 3.76% of the population were Hispanic or Latino of any race.

There were 67 households, out of which 22.4% had children under the age of 18 living with them, 29.9% were married couples living together, 7.5% had a female householder with no husband present, and 52.2% were non-families. 41.8% of all households were made up of individuals, and none had someone living alone who was 65 years of age or older. The average household size was 1.99 and the average family size was 2.75.

In the CDP the population was spread out, with 16.5% under the age of 18, 8.3% from 18 to 24, 33.1% from 25 to 44, 37.6% from 45 to 64, and 4.5% who were 65 years of age or older. The median age was 42 years. For every 100 females, there were 118.0 males. For every 100 females age 18 and over, there were 131.3 males.

The median income for a household in the CDP was $49,583, and the median income for a family was $44,375. Males had a median income of $36,875 versus $27,500 for females. The per capita income for the CDP was $32,252. There were 14.3% of families and 8.1% of the population living below the poverty line, including 9.1% of those under 18 and 0.0% of those over 64.

See also
Bear Valley (resort)

References

Sources
"Tuolumne-Calaveras Unit: 2005 Pre-Fire Management Plan September 28, 2005 Edition," California Department of Forestry and Fire Protection, 09-28-2005, pp. 16.

External links
Bear Valley music festival
Bear Valley wiki

Census-designated places in Alpine County, California
Stanislaus National Forest
Populated places in the Sierra Nevada (United States)